Jean-François Tournon (6 August 1905 – 12 April 1986) was a French fencer. He won a bronze medal in the team sabre event at the 1952 Summer Olympics.

References

External links
 

1905 births
1986 deaths
People from Bois-Colombes
French male sabre fencers
Olympic fencers of France
Fencers at the 1948 Summer Olympics
Fencers at the 1952 Summer Olympics
Olympic bronze medalists for France
Olympic medalists in fencing
Medalists at the 1952 Summer Olympics
Sportspeople from Hauts-de-Seine